Nagathihalli is a village in Indian state of Karnataka.
The village is in Mandya district of southern Karnataka. It is located along NH 48, 115 km from Bangalore, the capital of Karnataka State.

Notable people from Nagathihalli
 Nagathihalli Chandrashekhar

References

Villages in Mandya district